Lallange is a quarter in northern Esch-sur-Alzette, in south-western Luxembourg, Europe.

Quarters of Esch-sur-Alzette